All-Ireland Hurling Championship may refer to:

 All-Ireland Senior Hurling Championship
 All-Ireland Senior Club Hurling Championship
 All-Ireland Intermediate Club Hurling Championship
 All-Ireland Junior Club Hurling Championship
 All-Ireland Poc Fada Championship
 All-Ireland Intermediate Hurling Championship
 All-Ireland Minor Hurling Championship